Tarlac City, officially the City of Tarlac, is a 1st class component city and capital of the province of Tarlac, Philippines. According to the 2020 census, it has a population of 385,398 people.

The city was proclaimed as a highly urbanized city by the former President Gloria Macapagal Arroyo, but the decision was opposed by the provincial government.

History 

Tarlac's first settlers came from Bacolor, Pampanga. They cleared the area, fertilised the soil, and then established their settlement here in 1788. This small community of settlers experienced rapid population growth, as settlers from Bataan, Pampanga and Zambales moved into the area. The Kapampangan language, which is the dialect of Pampanga, became the native language of this town. Roads and barrios were built over the following decades through hard work of its residents. Following the foundation of the province of Tarlac in 1872, Tarlac was designated as the capital of the new province.

Cityhood

On June 21, 1969, President Ferdinand Marcos signed and approved the Republic Act 5907, converting this municipality into a city. However, its plebiscite was unsuccessful, showing their voters rejected cityhood.

On April 21, 1990, the barangays of Burgos, David, Iba, Labney, Lawacamulag, Lubigan, Maamot, Mababanaba, Moriones, Pao, San Juan de Valdez, Sula, and Villa Aglipay, originally part of the then-municipality of Tarlac, separated and formed to be the part of San Jose. Tarlac now retains its 274.66 km2 (106.05 sq mi) area.

Finally, on March 12, 1998, Republic Act 8593 was signed by President Fidel V. Ramos, making Tarlac as the component city of the province of Tarlac. On April 18, 1998, its residents approved the conversion of the municipality into a city. Tarlac was proclaimed as the component city by COMELEC on the next day, on April 19, 1998.

Highly urbanized city
On October 27, 2005, President Gloria Macapagal Arroyo signed the Proclamation No. 940, making Tarlac City into a highly urbanized city (HUC) in the province. However, the provincial government opposed the city's campaign for conversion into HUC. The majority of voters rejected the conversion in the plebiscite on February 11, 2006.

Geography
The city is situated at the centre of the province of Tarlac, along the Tarlac River. To its north is Gerona and Santa Ignacia, west is San Jose, south is Capas and Concepcion and eastern boundaries are Victoria and La Paz.

Tarlac City was historically a part of what is now Porac, Pampanga. Parts of Tarlac City are claimed to be among the few portions of land in the province which was not created by ancient eruptions from Mount Pinatubo.

Barangays
Tarlac City is politically subdivided into 77 barangays.

 Aguso
 Alvindia
 Amucao
 Armenia
 Asturias
 Atioc
 Balanti
 Balete
 Balibago I
 Balibago II
 Balingcanaway
 Banaba
 Bantog
 Baras-baras
 Batang-batang
 Binauganan
 Bora
 Buenavista
 Buhilit
 Burot
 Calingcuan
 Capehan
 Carangian
 Care 
 Central
 Culipat
 Cut-cut I
 Cut-cut II
 Dalayap
 Dela Paz
 Dolores
 Laoang
 Ligtasan
 Lourdes
 Mabini
 Maligaya
 Maliwalo
 Mapalacsiao
 Mapalad
 Matatalaib
 Paraiso
 Poblacion
 Salapungan
 San Carlos
 San Francisco
 San Isidro
 San Jose
 San Jose de Urquico
 San Juan Bautista (formerly Matadero)
 San Juan de Mata (formerly Malatiki)
 San Luis
 San Manuel
 San Miguel
 San Nicolas
 San Pablo
 San Pascual
 San Rafael, Tarlac City
 San Roque
 San Sebastian
 San Vicente
 Santa Cruz
 Santa Maria
 Santo Cristo
 Santo Domingo
 Santo Niño
 Sapang Maragul
 Sapang Tagalog
 Sepung Calzada (Panampunan)
 Sinait
 Suizo
 Tariji
 Tibag
 Tibagan 
 Trinidad
 Ungot
 Villa Bacolor

Climate

Demographics

Languages
Being at the meeting point of both Kapampangan and Pangasinan languages, cultures, and ethnicities, both languages are predominantly spoken in the city and environs. Ilocano and Tagalog are also used by a few city dwellers, especially those with Ilocano and/or Tagalog ethnicity/ancestry, respectively, with the latter language also serving as a medium for inter-ethnic communications.

Religion
According to statistics compiled by the Philippine government, the most dominant religion in the city is Christianity. The majority of Christians are Roman Catholics followed by a large concentration of Iglesia ni Cristo (Church of Christ). Other Christian groups belong to various Protestant denominations. There are some being non-Christian such as Muslims, etc.

Economy

Shopping malls
There are several shopping malls established within the city. To name a few, there is the SM City Tarlac, which is the first SM Supermall in the Tarlac Province, located along McArthur Highway in San Roque; Plaza Luisita Mall, which is the first shopping center in Central Luzon (now Robinsons Luisita); the Magic Star Mall along Romulo Blvd. in Barangay Cut-cut; My MetroTown Mall in Barangay Sto Cristo; Palm Plaza Mall located along McArthur Highway corner F. Tanedo St. Barangay Matatalaib; CityWalk also located in Barangay San Roque and CityMall located in Barangay San Rafael.

Education
As the educational center of Tarlac, Tarlac City houses the main campus of Tarlac State University, as well as other higher educational institutions.

The Tarlac City Schools Division of the Department of Education operates 87 elementary schools and 13 high schools as of 2013.

Some private schools in Tarlac City are the Don Bosco Technical Institute, College of the Holy Spirit, Kian Tiak School, and the Ecumenical Christian College.

Tourism

Festivals
The Malatarlak Festival, celebrated every January in Tarlac City, is one of the most remarkable festivals in the province. In 2011, the City Mayor then changed the name of the festival to Melting Pot Festival, but it is still remembered by its former name. The festival is a commemoration to the first people who built civilization in the province, the Aetas. The names and themes of the festivals in Tarlac City have changed over the years depending on the city's leadership. For the current administration (since July 2016), the local fiesta or festival has been called Kaisa Festival derived from the word magkaisa (to unite).

Transportation

Tarlac City is the usual bus stop for commuters traveling from the South to the Ilocos Region and Cordillera provinces. Bus companies that take a route through the city include Pangasinan Solid North Transit, Inc., Dagupan Bus Company, Philippine Rabbit, Victory Liner, Five Star, First North Luzon Transit, Luzon Cisco Transport, Genesis, Santrans, Viron Transit, Partas, and many others. Many of the bus companies' rest stops can be found along MacArthur Highway including Siesta and Motorway.

The MacArthur Highway goes from the southern to the northern end of the city. There are a series of roads leading to Zambales and Pangasinan as well as Baguio. Most buses passing through the town of Camiling onwards to Pangasinan usually take the Romulo Highway which forks from MacArthur Highway along Barangay San Roque.

Subic–Clark–Tarlac Expressway (SCTEx) connects with Tarlac–Pangasinan–La Union Expressway (TPLEx) and Central Luzon Link Expressway (CLLEx) within the capital of the province. The 3 expressways serves as an alternate route for motorists going to the other parts of Northern Luzon area such as Cagayan Valley, Aurora, Nueva Ecija, Pangasinan, La Union and Baguio while in the Marcos Highway via TPLEX and Kennon Road from McArthur Highway.

Sister cities
 Angeles City
 Cabanatuan
 Taguig
 Baguio
 Bauan, Batangas

References

External links

 [ Philippine Standard Geographic Code]
Tarlac Province Official Portal
Philippine Statistics Authority

 
Populated places in Tarlac
Cities in Central Luzon
Provincial capitals of the Philippines
Populated places established in 1788
1788 establishments in the Philippines
Component cities in the Philippines